The  Yu-Gi-Oh! Trading Card Game is a collectible card game developed and published by Konami. It is based on the fictional game of Duel Monsters created by manga artist Kazuki Takahashi, which appears in portions of the manga franchise Yu-Gi-Oh! and is the central plot device throughout its various anime adaptations and spinoff series.

The trading card game was launched by Konami in 1999 in Japan and March 2002 in North America. It was named the top selling trading card game in the world by Guinness World Records on July 7, 2009, having sold over 22 billion cards worldwide. As of March 31, 2011, Konami Digital Entertainment Co., Ltd. Japan sold  billion cards globally since 1999. Yu-Gi-Oh! Speed Duel, a faster and simplified version of the game, was launched worldwide in January 2019. Another faster-paced variation, Yu-Gi-Oh! Rush Duel, launched in Japan in April 2020.

Gameplay
In the trading card game, players draw cards from their respective decks and take turns playing cards onto "the field". Each player uses a deck containing forty to sixty cards, and an optional "Extra Deck" of up to fifteen cards. There is also an optional fifteen-card side deck, which allows players to swap cards from their main deck and/or extra deck between games. Players are restricted to three of each card per deck and must follow the Forbidden/Limited card list, which restricts selected cards by Konami to be limited to two, one, or zero. Each player starts with 8,000 "Life Points" (LP), with the main aim of the game to use monster attacks and spells to reduce the opponent's Life Points. The game ends upon reaching one of the following conditions:
 A player loses if their Life Points reaches zero. If both players reach zero Life Points at the same time, the game ends in a draw.
 A player loses if they are required to draw a card, but has no more cards to draw in the Main Deck.
 Certain cards have special conditions which trigger an automatic win or loss when its conditions are met (e.g. having all five cards of Exodia the Forbidden One in the hand or all five letters of the Destiny Board on the field).
 A player can forfeit at any time.

Zones
Cards are laid out in the following manner:
 Main Deck: The player's Main Deck is placed here face-down, and can consist of 40 to 60 cards. Normal, Effect, Ritual, and Pendulum Monsters can be stored here. Spell and Trap Cards are also stored here.
 Extra Deck: The player's Extra Deck is placed here face-down, if they have one, and may have 15 cards consisting of Fusion, Synchro, Xyz, and Link Monster cards. Pendulum Monsters are placed face-up here when they would otherwise be sent from the field to the Graveyard.
 Graveyard (GY): A Zone where cards are sent when they are discarded or destroyed, such as used Spell/Trap Cards which were used or monsters that are tributed or destroyed in battle.
 Main Monster Zones: A field of five spaces where Monster cards are placed when successfully Summoned. Prior to the addition of Link Monsters, any kind of monster could be placed there at any time. After Link Monsters were introduced, monsters from the Extra Deck could only be Special Summoned from the Extra Deck to the Extra Monster Zone, or a Main Monster Zone a Link Monster points to, up until the rule change for April 2020 onward, where only Link Monsters and Pendulum Monsters from the Extra Deck follow this restriction.
 Extra Monster Zones: Introduced with Link Monsters, this is a Zone where monsters from the Extra Deck can be Summoned. An Extra Monster Zone is not a part of either player's field until they Summon a monster to the Extra Monster Zone.
 Spell/Trap Zones: Five spaces in which either Spell or Trap cards can be placed. The leftmost and rightmost Spell/Trap Zones can optionally be treated as "Pendulum Zones" by placing Pendulum Monsters there, allowing players to use Pendulum Effects and perform Pendulum Summons.
 The Pendulum Zones originally were at the left and right sides of the Main Monster and Spell/Trap Zones when introduced with the Arc-V era, but were integrated into the leftmost and rightmost Spell/Trap Zones during the VRAINS era.
 Field Zone: A Zone where Field Spell cards are placed.
 Cards that are "banished" by card effects are placed outside of the game in a pile.

Phases
Each player's turn contains six phases that take place in the following order:
 Draw Phase: The turn player draws one card from their Deck.
 Standby Phase: No specific action occurs, but it exists for card effects and maintenance costs that activate or resolve during this specific phase.
 Main Phase 1: The turn player may Normal Summon or Set a monster, activate cards and effects that they control, change the battle position of a monster (provided it was not summoned this turn), and Set Spells or Traps face-down.
 Battle Phase: The turn player may choose to attack their opponent using any monsters on their field in Attack Position. Depending on the position of opposing monster, the attacking monster's ATK points are taken into account against the opposing monster's ATK or DEF points. If both monsters are in Attack Position, the monster with fewer ATK points is destroyed and its owner takes life point damage equal the difference between both monster's ATK points (if both monsters have equal ATK points, they are both destroyed and no damage is taken, unless both of their ATK points are 0, in which case neither is destroyed). If the opposing monster is in Defense Position and has fewer DEF points than the attacking monster's ATK points, it is destroyed and the owner takes no damage. However, if its DEF point is higher, the attacker takes life point damage equal to the difference between the two values. If the defending player has no monsters defending them, a Direct Attack can be performed, with the defending player receiving life point damage equal to the attacking monster's ATK points. The turn player can choose to not enter the battle phase and instead go to the End Phase.
 Main Phase 2: The player may do all the same actions that are available during Main Phase 1, though they cannot repeat certain actions already taken in Main Phase 1 (such as Normal Summoning) or change the battle position of a monster that has already been summoned, attacked, or had their battle position changed during the same turn.
 End Phase: This phase also exists for card effects and maintenance costs that activate or resolve during this specific phase. Once this phase is resolved, the player ends their turn.

The player who begins the game does not draw during the Draw Phase and cannot enter the Battle Phase during their first turn.

Card types
Gameplay revolves around three types of cards: Monster, Spell, and Trap cards. Monster cards are monsters used to attack and defend against the opposing player, mainly for the purpose of damaging an opponent's life points. Spells, which can either be played from the hand or set for later use, provide various effects such as altering a monster's strength, drawing additional cards, or removing an opponent's cards from the field. Traps are cards that are set on the field in advance and activated in later turns when certain conditions are made, such as when an opponent targets a player's monster.

With some exceptions, a typical Monster cards possesses ATK and DEF points which determine its attack and defense power in battles, a Level represented by stars, with more powerful monsters typically possessing higher levels, an Attribute that certain effects may react to, and a description listing the Monster's types and any effects or summoning conditions they may possess. Monsters are summoned to the field through three main categories of summoning; Normal, Tribute, and Special. Once during a player's Main Phase, players can choose to Normal Summon a Lv4 or lower Normal or Effect monster from their hand in face-up Attack Position or face-down Defense Position, or Tribute Summon a Lv5 or higher Monster by tributing one or more Monsters already on the field. Special Summons are performed by utilising card effects or fulfilling the conditions of other summoning methods, such as those used to summon cards from the Extra Deck, and can be performed as many times as possible if the conditions are met.

The game currently features the following types of Monster.
 Normal (yellow): A monster with no effects of its own. Stored in the Main Deck and can be Normal, Tribute, or Special Summoned.
 Effect (orange): A monster that possesses at least one effect. Can be summoned in the same manner as Normal Monsters.
 Ritual (blue): Stored in the Main Deck, these monsters can typically only be Special Summoned by using a Ritual Spell card and tributing required monsters listed in its instructions.
 Fusion (purple): Stored in the Extra Deck, these monsters are summoned by utilising cards with a "Fusion" effect, such as Polymerization, and tributing monsters listed in the monster's description.
 Synchro (white): Stored in the Extra Deck, these monsters are summoned by tributing from the field a Tuner-type monster and one or more non-Tuner-type monsters whose levels equal the level of the Synchro Monster being summoned. 
 Xyz (black): Stored in the Extra Deck, these monsters possess Ranks as opposed to levels, and require two or more Monsters whose level is the same as the Xyz Monster's Rank. These monsters become the Xyz Monster's "overlay units", which can then be sent to the GY to activate effects.
 Pendulum (green gradient): Variations of other monster types which, if sent from the field to the GY, are placed face up in the Extra Deck instead. Pendulum Monsters can be placed in Pendulum Zones in the leftmost and rightmost Spell/Trap Zones, where they can utilise Pendulum Effects. When both Pendulum Zones contain Pendulum Monsters with differently valued "Pendulum Scales", players can perform a Pendulum Summon during the main phase to summon multiple monsters from the hand and face-up Pendulum Monsters from the Extra Deck whose levels lie between the two Pendulum Scale values.
 Link (dark blue): Stored in the Extra Deck, Link Monsters have Link values instead of levels and can only be played in Attack position. These are summoned by tributing one or more monsters on the field that meets the summon requirements, with Link Monsters able to be used as multiple tributes depending on its Link value. Link Monsters feature arrows which, when pointed towards other zones on the field, allows additional Link Monsters to be summoned outside of the Extra Monster Zone. Link Monsters may also possess effects that can be used when another card is a linked zone.
 Token (grey): A low-level monster that can only be summoned through card effects. These cards do not exist outside of the field and are removed from play upon leaving. While official Token Monster cards do exist, players can use other objects such as coins to represent Token Monsters.

Spell cards, green, are magical spells with a variety of effects, such reviving destroyed monsters. They can be played from the hand during a player's turn or placed faced down for activation on a later turn. There are six types of Spell Card:
Normal: A spell that can only be activated during the player's Main Phase.
Quick Play: A spell that can be played at any time during the player's turn, or can be set and activated during an opponent's turn.
Continuous: A spell with a continuous effect that remains until conditions are met or it is destroyed.
Equip: A spell that is equipped to a Monster, providing it with support effects. It is removed if the monsters leaves the field or is set face-down, or the card is destroyed.
Field: A spell that is placed in a player's Field Spell Zone, which affects the entire field. Each player can only have one Field Spell in play at a time.
Ritual: A spell that is required to summon a Ritual Monster.

Trap cards, dark pink, have to be Set on a player's field face-down and can only be activated after the turn they were set has passed, including the opponent's turn. (Quick Play spells, when Set, have the same rule.) They are generally used to stop or counter the opponent's moves, and come in three varieties.
Normal: A standard trap that is discarded once its effect resolves.
Continuous: A trap that remains on the field until destroyed or its conditions are met.
Counter: A trap that is activated in response to the activation of other cards.

Formats
Tournaments are often hosted either by players or by card shops. In addition, Konami, Upper Deck (now no longer part of Yu-Gi-Oh! Organized Play), and Shonen Jump have all organized numerous tournament systems in their respective areas. These tournaments attract hundreds of players to compete for prizes such as rare promotional cards.

There are two styles of tournament play called "Formats"; each format has its own rules and some restrictions on what cards are allowed to be used during events.

The Advanced Format is used in all sanctioned tournaments (with the exception of certain Pegasus League formats). This format follows all the normal rules of the game, but also places a complete ban on certain cards that are deemed too powerful for tournament play. These cards are on a special list called the Forbidden, or Banned List. There are also certain cards that are Limited or Semi-Limited to only being allowed 1 or 2 of those cards in a deck and side deck combined, respectively. This list is updated every three months (January 1, April 1) and is followed in all tournaments that use this format.

Traditional format is sometimes used in Pegasus League play and is never used in Official Tournaments and reflects the state of the game without banned cards. Cards that are banned in Advanced are limited to one copy per deck in this format.

The game formerly incorporated worldwide rankings, but since Konami canceled organized play, the ratings were obsolete. Konami has developed a new rating system called "COSSY" (Konami Card Game Official Tournament Support System).

With the introduction of the Battle Pack: Epic Dawn, Konami has announced the introduction of drafting tournaments. This continued with a second set for sealed play: Battle Pack: War Of The Giants in 2013. The final Battle Pack, Battle Pack 3: Monster League, was released in August 2014, with no Battle Pack products released since.

Product information
Yu-Gi-Oh! Trading Cards are available in Starter Decks, Structure Decks, booster packs, collectible tins, and occasionally as promotional cards.

Booster packs 
As in all other trading card games, booster packs are the primary avenue of card distribution. In Konami's distribution areas, five or nine random cards are found in each booster pack depending on the set and each set contains around one hundred different cards. However, in Upper Deck's areas, early booster packs contained a random assortment of nine cards (rarity and value varies), with the whole set ranging around one hundred and thirty cards. To catch up with the Japanese meta game, two or more original sets were combined into one. Now, more recent Upper Deck sets have simply duplicated the original set. Some booster sets are reprinted/reissued (e.g. Dark Beginnings Volume 1 and 2). This type of set usually contains a larger number of cards (around 200 to 250), and they contain twelve cards along with one tip card rather than the normal five or nine. Since the release of Tactical Evolution in 2007, all booster packs that have a Holographic/Ghost Rare card, will also contain a rare. Current sets have 100 different cards per set. There are also special booster packs that are given to those who attend a tournament. These sets change each time there is a different tournament and have fewer cards than a typical booster pack. There are eight Tournament Packs, eight Champion Packs, and 10 Turbo Packs.

Duelist packs 
Duelist packs are similar to booster packs, albeit are focused around the types of cards used by characters in the various anime series. Cards in each pack are reduced from nine to five.

Promotional cards 
Some cards in the TCG have been released by other means, such as inclusion in video games, movies, and Shonen Jump Magazine issues. These cards often are exclusive and have a special type of rarity or are never-before-seen to the public. Occasionally, cards like Elemental Hero Stratos and Chimeratech Fortress Dragon have been re-released as revisions.

Yu-Gi-Oh! Speed Duel
Yu-Gi-Oh! Speed Duel is a specialised version of the Yu-Gi-Oh! Trading Card Game which launched worldwide in January 2019. Being based on the ruleset of Yu-Gi-Oh! Duel Links, it features four basic card types: Monster Cards, Spell Cards, Trap Cards and an exclusive type of card called Skill Cards.

Speed Duel games are known for its rapid duels, averaging on 10 minutes.

When compared to the advanced format:
The playing field has only three Monster Zones and three Spell/Trap Zones, as opposed to five.
Synchro, Xyz, Pendulum and Link Monsters do not exist in Speed Duel.
There is no Main Phase 2.
The main deck must have between 20 and 30 cards, as opposed to between 40 and 60.
Players begin with 4000 Life Points, as opposed to 8000.
Players begin the game by drawing four cards each, as opposed to five.
Each player can only have one Skill Card.

Yu-Gi-Oh! Rush Duel
 is a variation of the Yu-Gi-Oh! Trading Card Game which launched in Japan in April 2020 alongside the release of the Yu-Gi-Oh! Sevens anime series. This variation of the game, acting as a successor to the Speed Duel format, uses a different set of cards from the main OCG/TCG entirely, though certain cards appear in Rush Duel. Rush Duel features reworked rules similar to those introduced in Speed Duels and expanded upon with a more streamlined version of the original to make the game faster.

The playing field now has only three Monster Zones and three Spell/Trap Zones, and Extra Monster Zones and Pendulum Zones are not featured.
The phase order for each turn is Draw, Main, Battle, and End. Unlike the main game, there is no Standby Phase or Main Phase 2.
Players begin the game with four cards each, with the starting player able to draw on their first turn. During the Draw Phase of each player's turn, they must keep drawing until they have five cards in their hand. If the player already has five or more cards in their hand, they may only draw one card. There is no maximum limit to the number of cards players can have in their hand. However, if a player is unable to draw the required amount of cards when asked to (e.g. if the player's hand is empty and there are four or less cards remaining in their deck at the start of their Draw Phase), they will automatically lose the game.
Players can Normal Summon and Tribute Summon as many times as possible during a single turn.
Certain cards, such as Blue-Eyes White Dragon, are marked with a "Legend" icon. Each player may only have one Legend card in their deck.
In addition to Normal and Effect monsters, there are currently two other monster card types: Maximum and Fusion. Maximum Monsters are sets of three corresponding monster cards that, when assembled in the hand, can be summoned to the field in "Maximum Mode", where they are treated as a single powerful monster with its attack power represented by the Maximum ATK value on the central card. Fusion Monsters, similar to the main game's Fusion monsters, are stored in the Extra Deck and summoned using cards with a Fusion effect and sending the Fusion material monsters from the field to the graveyard. Some Fusion Monsters possess Types not found among Main Deck monsters based on a fusion of their Fusion materials' Types: for example a Cyborg Type Fusion Monster is created by fusing a Machine Type monster with a monster that has a different Type. Some Fusion Monsters possess "selection effects", allowing players to activate one of multiple effects during their turn if the conditions are met.

Comparison to other media
In its original incarnation in Kazuki Takahashi's Yu-Gi-Oh! manga series, Duel Monsters, originally known as Magic & Wizards, had a rather basic structure, not featuring many of the restricting rules introduced later on and often featuring peculiar exceptions to the rulings in the interest of providing a more engrossing story. Beginning with the Battle City arc of the manga and Yu-Gi-Oh! Duel Monsters anime series, more structured rules such as tribute requirements were introduced to the story, with the series falling more in line with the rules of the real life card-game by the time its spin-off series began. From the Duel Monsters anime onwards, characters use cards which resemble their real life counterparts, though some monsters or effects differ between that of the real life trading card game and the manga and anime's Duel Monsters, with some cards created exclusively for those mediums. Yu-Gi-Oh! 5D's featured an anime-original card type known as Dark Synchro, which involved using "Dark Tuners" to summon Dark Synchro Monsters with negative levels. Dark Synchro cards were featured in the PlayStation Portable video game, Yu-Gi-Oh! 5D's Tag Force 4, while Dark Synchro Monsters featured in the anime were released as standard Synchro Monsters in the real-life game. Yu-Gi-Oh! Arc-V features Action Cards, spell and trap cards that are picked up in the series' unique Action Duels, which are not possible to perform in the real life game. In the film Yu-Gi-Oh!: The Dark Side of Dimensions, an exclusive form of summoning known as Dimension Summoning is featured. This method allows players to freely summon a monster by deciding how many ATK or DEF points it has, but they receive damage equal to that amount when the monster is destroyed. The Yu-Gi-Oh! VRAINS anime series features Speed Duels which use a smaller number of Monster and Spell & Trap Zones and remove Main Phase 2 for faster duels. In the anime, characters can activate unique Skills depending on the situation (for example, the protagonist Yusaku can draw a random monster when his life points are below 1000) once per duel. A similar ruleset is featured in the Duel Terminal arcade machine series and the Duel Links mobile game.

With the exception of the films Pyramid of Light and The Dark Side of Dimensions, which base the card's appearance on the English version of the real-life card game, all Western releases of the Yu-Gi-Oh! Duel Monsters anime and its subsequent spin-off series, produced by 4Kids Entertainment and later Konami Cross Media NY, edit the appearance of cards to differentiate them from their real-life counterparts in accordance with U.S. Federal Communications Commission regulations in concerning program-length commercials, as well as to make the show more marketable across non-English speaking countries. These cards are edited to only display their background, illustration, level/rank, and ATK/DEF points.

Konami-Upper Deck lawsuit 
From March 2002 to December 2008, Konami's trading cards were distributed in territories outside of Asia by The Upper Deck Company. In December 2008, Konami filed a lawsuit against Upper Deck alleging that it had distributed inauthentic Yu-Gi-Oh! TCG cards made without Konami's authorization. Upper Deck also sued Konami alleging breach of contract and slander. A few months later, a federal court in Los Angeles issued an injunction preventing Upper Deck from acting as the authorized distributor and requiring it to remove the Yu-Gi-Oh! TCG from Upper Deck's website. In December 2009, the court decided that Upper Deck was liable for counterfeiting Yu-Gi-Oh! TCG cards, and it dismissed Upper Deck's countersuit against Konami. Konami is now the manufacturer and distributor of the Yu-Gi-Oh! TCG. It runs Regional and National tournaments and continues to release new Yu-Gi-Oh! TCG card products.

Notes

References

External links

 Official Konami Trading Card Game website
 Yu-Gi-Oh! Online worldwide portal
 Yu-Gi-Oh! Decklist-Archive
 Official Yu-Gi-Oh! Card Database
 Guinness World Records best selling trading card game as of 31 March 2011

 
1990s fads and trends
2000s fads and trends
2010s fads and trends
2020s fads and trends
Card games introduced in 1999
Collectible card games
Digital collectible card games
Japanese card games
Konami
Upper Deck Company games